Paul Couch (19 July 1964 – 5 March 2016) was an Australian rules footballer who played for Geelong in the Australian Football League.

Football career
Prior to playing with Geelong, Couch initially tried out with Fitzroy but was rejected for being too slow.

He was recruited from the Warrnambool Football Club and, though never blessed with pace and with a very "one-sided" left-foot kick, he had the ability to make position and place his team to advantage throughout twelve (often knee injury–ridden) years.

As a traditional "centreman", Couch was the pivot for the leading teams of 1989–1995.

While lacking outright pace, he had a strong work ethic, along with a good football brain and disposal skills, and was well-regarded as a centreman. Couch played 259 games and kicked 203 goals for Geelong from 1985 to 1997 and won the Brownlow Medal in 1989. Couch was known for his broad toothy smile. He formed a strong partnership in the midfield with good friend Mark Bairstow. Together, they both serviced tenured forwards Gary Ablett and Billy Brownless with pinpoint passes. Couch represented Victoria five times, was named All-Australian two times (1991, 1995) and won three club best and fairest awards (1986, 1989, 1995), as well as being named in Geelong's Team of the Century.

Family
Couch's son Tom Couch played three games for the Melbourne Football Club before being delisted in 2013. He is currently signed to Collingwood's VFL. Couch's nephew, Nick Couch, plays for the North Ballarat Football Club in the Victorian Football League (VFL). His father, Bill Couch, played in the Hampden Football League for the Warrnambool Football Club, winning the club's best and fairest twice and playing in four premierships. Couch's two brothers, Bill and Peter, also played for Warrnambool.

Death
Couch died on 5 March 2016; he was cycling with friends near Apollo Bay, Victoria, when he came off his bike. It was reported he had a heart attack

Playing statistics

|- style="background-color: #EAEAEA"
! scope="row" style="text-align:center" | 1985
|style="text-align:center;"|
| 7 || 17 || 15 || 23 || 202 || 107 || 309 || 60 ||  || 0.9 || 1.4 || 11.9 || 6.3 || 18.2 || 3.5 || 
|-
! scope="row" style="text-align:center" | 1986
|style="text-align:center;"|
| 7 || 18 || 12 || 10 || 247 || 143 || 390 || 80 ||  || 0.7 || 0.6 || 13.7 || 7.9 || 21.7 || 4.4 || 
|- style="background-color: #EAEAEA"
! scope="row" style="text-align:center" | 1987
|style="text-align:center;"|
| 7 || 19 || 14 || 14 || 292 || 118 || 410 || 78 || 32 || 0.7 || 0.7 || 15.4 || 6.2 || 21.6 || 4.1 || 1.7
|-
! scope="row" style="text-align:center" | 1988
|style="text-align:center;"|
| 7 || 17 || 15 || 13 || 262 || 174 || 436 || 67 || 27 || 0.9 || 0.8 || 15.4 || 10.2 || 25.6 || 3.9 || 1.6
|- style="background:#eaeaea;"
! scope="row" style="text-align:center" | 1989
|style="text-align:center;"|
| 7 || 26 || 23 || 19 || 415 || 285 || bgcolor="DD6E81"| 700 || 82 || 56 || 0.9 || 0.7 || 16.0 || 11.0 || 26.9 || 3.2 || 2.2
|-
! scope="row" style="text-align:center" | 1990
|style="text-align:center;"|
| 7 || 20 || 13 || 16 || 286 || 222 || 508 || 63 || 35 || 0.7 || 0.8 || 14.3 || 11.1 || 25.4 || 3.2 || 1.8
|- style="background:#eaeaea;"
! scope="row" style="text-align:center" | 1991
|style="text-align:center;"|
| 7 || 24 || 21 || 17 || 374 || 262 || 636 || 73 || 44 || 0.9 || 0.7 || 15.6 || 10.9 || 26.5 || 3.0 || 1.8
|-
! scope="row" style="text-align:center" | 1992
|style="text-align:center;"|
| 7 || 23 || 26 || 14 || 293 || 201 || 494 || 82 || 43 || 1.1 || 0.6 || 12.7 || 8.7 || 21.5 || 3.6 || 1.9
|- style="background:#eaeaea;"
! scope="row" style="text-align:center" | 1993
|style="text-align:center;"|
| 7 || 20 || 14 || 10 || 260 || 179 || 439 || 38 || 32 || 0.7 || 0.5 || 13.0 || 9.0 || 22.0 || 1.9 || 1.6
|-
! scope="row" style="text-align:center" | 1994
|style="text-align:center;"|
| 7 || 24 || 29 || 23 || 327 || 229 || 556 || 64 || 53 || 1.2 || 1.0 || 13.6 || 9.5 || 23.2 || 2.7 || 2.2
|-style="background:#eaeaea;"
! scope="row" style="text-align:center" | 1995
|style="text-align:center;"|
| 7 || 25 || 13 || 12 || 401 || 221 || 622 || 57 || 48 || 0.5 || 0.5 || 16.0 || 8.8 || 24.9 || 2.3 || 1.9
|-
! scope="row" style="text-align:center" | 1996
|style="text-align:center;"|
| 7 || 21 || 5 || 10 || 330 || 134 || 464 || 72 || 35 || 0.2 || 0.5 || 15.7 || 6.4 || 22.1 || 3.4 || 1.7
|-style="background:#eaeaea;"
! scope="row" style="text-align:center" | 1997
|style="text-align:center;"|
| 7 || 5 || 3 || 0 || 49 || 29 || 78 || 8 || 6 || 0.6 || 0.0 || 9.8 || 5.8 || 15.6 || 1.6 || 1.2
|- class="sortbottom"
! colspan=3| Career
! 259
! 203
! 181
! 3738
! 2304
! 6042
! 824
! 411
! 0.8
! 0.7
! 14.4
! 8.9
! 23.3
! 3.2
! 1.8
|}

Honours and achievements

Team
McClelland Trophy (Geelong): 1992
Individual
Brownlow Medal: 1989
Carji Greeves Medal: 1986, 1989, 1995
All-Australian: 1991, 1995
Geelong F.C. Team of the Century - Interchange

References

External links 

1964 births
All-Australians (AFL)
Brownlow Medal winners
Carji Greeves Medal winners
Geelong Football Club players
Warrnambool Football Club players
Australian rules footballers from Victoria (Australia)
Victorian State of Origin players
2016 deaths
Australia international rules football team players
People from Warrnambool